Ostrich is the fifteenth studio album by the American rock band Crack the Sky, released in 2012.

Track listing 

All tracks were composed by John Palumbo and performed by Crack the Sky.

The band 

 John Palumbo (Vocals/Guitar/Keyboards)
 Bobby Hird (Vocals/Guitar/Mandolin)
 Joe Macre (Bass synthesizer/Electric bass)
 Rick Witkowski (Vocals/Guitar)
 Glenn Workman (Vocals/Keyboards)
 Joey D'Amico (Vocals/Drums)

References 

 Wesley Case, “Crack the Sky — ‘Ostrich’ (Aluminum Cat)”, The Baltimore Sun

External links 

 
 Review at FAME
 Ostrich at allmusic.com

2012 albums
Crack the Sky albums